Gvenetadze is a Georgian surname (. Notable people with the surname include:

Koba Gvenetadze (born 1971), Governor of the National Bank of Georgia
Nino Gvenetadze (born 1964), Georgian magistrate, former President of the Supreme Court

Georgian-language surnames